Greek–South Korean relations are the foreign relations between Greece and South Korea. Greece has an embassy in Seoul and an honorary consulate in Daejeon. South Korea has an embassy in Athens.

History
As soon as 1950, Greece sent an expeditionary force to help the South Koreans against the communists during the Korean War. And at that time, the small Orthodox community of Korea received support by Greek military chaplain ministers. Then, Korean Orthodox faithful requested to come under the spiritual care of the Ecumenical Patriarchate of Constantinople in 1955 and the Ecumenical Patriarchate took the Korean Orthodox Church under its protection in 1956. Both countries established diplomatic relations on April 15, 1961. South Korea opened its embassy in Athens on July 6, 1973. Greece opened its embassy in Seoul in October 1991. Greece also has an honorary consulate in Daejeon.

List of bilateral visits
From South Korea to Greece
 May 1995, Deputy Minister for Policy Planning and International Organizations Ban Ki-moon
 May 2000, Speaker of the National Assembly Park Joon-kyu 
 October 2001, Minister of Maritime Affairs and Fisheries Yoo Sam-nam
 August 2002, Minister for Trade Hwang Doo-yun
 April 2004, Minister of Foreign Affairs Ban Ki-moon
 August 2004, Minister of Culture and Tourism Jung Dong-chae
 April 2006, Minister of Foreign Affairs Ban Ki-moon
 September 2006, President Roh Moo-hyun
 June 2007, Minister of Maritime Affairs and Fisheries Kang Moo-hyun
 October 2007, Minister of Maritime Affairs and Fisheries Kang Moo-hyun
 
From Greece to South Korea
 July 1987, Minister of Foreign Affairs Karolos Papoulias
 November 1990, Prime of Ministers Konstantinos Mitsotakis
 March 1998, Minister of the Mercantile Marine Stavros Soumakis
 October 2000, Alternate Foreign Minister Elisavet Papazoi
 February  2003, Alternate Foreign Minister Tasso Giannitsis
 November 2004, Minister of Agricultural Development Evangelos Bassiakos
 January 2005, Minister of Mercantile Marine Manolis Kefalogiannis
 June 2007, Minister of Transportation and Communications Michalis Liapis

List of bilateral treaties
 Education agreement (July 23, 1970)
 Trade agreement (October 4, 1974)
 Agreement on abolition of visa requirements (February 25, 1979)
 Agreement on scientific and technological cooperation (May 16, 1994)
 Aviation agreement (January 25, 1995)
 Agreement on investment protection (January 25, 1995)
 Agreement on avoidance of double taxation (March 20, 1995)

See also
Foreign relations of Greece
Foreign relations of South Korea
Greek Expeditionary Force (Korea)
Korean Orthodox Church

References

External links 
  Greek Ministry of Foreign Affairs about the relation with South Korea
  South Korean Ministry of Foreign Affairs and Trade about the relation with Greece
  Site of the South Korean embassy in Athens

 
Korea, South
Greece